KIAA1257 is a protein that in humans is encoded by the KIAA1257 gene. KIAA1257 has been shown to be involved with activation of genes involved in sex determination
.

Gene
In humans the gene KIAA1257 is located on chromosome 3q21.3. It spans 122 kilobasepairs (kBp) and contains 22 exons. It is flanked by Ras-related protein Rab-43 and several pseudogenes and on the opposite strand Acyl CoA dehydrogenase family member 9 (ACAD9) and EF-hand and coiled-coil domain containing 1 (EFCC1).

Transcripts
The exons of KIAA1257 are alternatively spliced into 17 different isoforms (Table 1). Isoform X1 encodes the longest protein product and isoform X4 is the most common variant translated. Both the 5' and 3' UTR's are capable of forming stem loop structures that could serve as binding site for RNA-binding proteins. 

Table 1

Protein 

The protein KIAA1257 exists most commonly as a translation of the mRNA isoform X4, which is only half the length of isoform X1's product even though they have similar mRNA lengths. Protein isoform X1 is 1179 amino acids long, has a molecular weight of 136.4 kilodaltons (kDa) and an isoelectric point (pI) of 8.1.  KIAA1257 contains a domain of unknown function (DUF) 4550 in the first third of the protein sequence that has a high lysine content (15%). Most of the protein exists in a random coil structure but the final thirds contains 6 predicted alpha helices. KIAA1257 is predicted to be localized to the nucleus and contains several nuclear localization signals.   A summary of KIAA1257 orthologs is shown below.

Table 2

Expression and Regulation 
KIAA1257 is mainly expressed in the testes and ovaries of adult humans, however expression is low in these tissues. KIAA1257 is most highly expressed during the earliest stages of development. Expression is the highest in the 2 through 8 cell stages of embryonic development and begins to decline steadily after morula and then blastocyst formation.

KIAA1257 has a promoter region upstream of the 5' UTR with several transcription factor binding sites including a Sox11 binding site. Sox11 is involved in the regulation of many developmental genes.

Clinical Significance 
KIAA1257 has been shown to activate expression of Nuclear receptor subfamily 5 group A member 1 (NR5A1). NR5A1 is involved in sex determination and defects in the gene are related to XY sex reversal.

Homology 
KIAA1257 is found in all vertebrates except for cartilaginous and jawless fishes. KIAA1257 orthologs in birds, fish, and reptiles have 30-40% identity with humans while mammals such as goats, cats, and dogs have 60-70% identity and primates have 85-99% identity. 

Table 3

References

Further reading